Consort Huang may refer to:

Empress Dowager Huang (died after 936), concubine of Wang Shenzhi
Consort Hwang (Yongle) (1401–1421), or Consort Huang, concubine of the Yongle Emperor
Concubine Yi (Qianlong) (died 1736), concubine of the Qianlong Emperor